Estelle Nze Minko (born 11 August 1991) is a French handball player for Győri ETO KC and the French national team.

Achievements
EHF Cup:
Winner: 2019
Hungarian Championship
Winner: 2022
Hungarian Cup
Winner: 2021

Individual awards
 MVP of the European Championship: 2020
 All-Star Left Back of the Møbelringen Cup: 2018
 MVP of the EHF Cup Final: 2019

References

External links

1991 births
Living people
French sportspeople of Gabonese descent
French female handball players
Expatriate handball players
French expatriate sportspeople in Hungary
Siófok KC players
Győri Audi ETO KC players
Olympic handball players of France
Olympic medalists in handball
Olympic gold medalists for France
Olympic silver medalists for France
Handball players at the 2016 Summer Olympics
Handball players at the 2020 Summer Olympics
Medalists at the 2016 Summer Olympics
Medalists at the 2020 Summer Olympics
European champions for France